Samuel Atkins Eliot (March 5, 1798 – January 29, 1862) was a member of the notable Eliot family of Boston, Massachusetts who served in political positions at the local, state and national levels.

Early life

Eliot was born in Boston, Massachusetts in 1798. He was the son of banker Samuel Eliot and Catherine Atkins Eliot, and was related to Congressman Thomas Hopkinson Eliot. He attended the Boston Latin School, and graduated from Harvard University in 1817 and from Harvard Divinity School in 1820. His father had wanted to see him become a minister, but he died the year of his graduation and Samuel stopped short of the pulpit. Instead he traveled Europe for two years, gaining great knowledge in music and singing, and developing interests in parks and playgrounds.

Career
His interest in music led him to become president of the Boston Academy of Music from 1834 to 1847. As an influential member of the Boston school committee, he was successful in placing music in the curriculum of all public schools. With his brother William he founded the Union Church in Nahant, Massachusetts, where he had earlier built a classical Greek revival summer home at 40 Steps Beach on Nahant Road. He served as the first president of the Boston Provident Association, one of the first organizations to aid the poor. He assisted developing the Prison Discipline Society, becoming its treasurer and president to reduce the miserable conditions found in the houses of correction.

He was a member of the Massachusetts House of Representatives from 1834 to 1837. Elected three consecutive terms between 1837 and 1840 as Mayor of Boston. During his administration a riot took place, caused by a collision between a volunteer fire company and an Irish funeral procession. The disturbance was suppressed by the promptness of Mayor Eliot, who was on the ground at the first alarm, and immediately took measures for calling out the militia. The result of this affair was the establishment of a paid fire department and a day police.

Eliot served in the Massachusetts Senate in 1843–1844. He was elected as a Whig to the 31st United States Congress to fill the vacancy caused by the resignation of Robert C. Winthrop, and served from August 22, 1850, to March 3, 1851; he declined to be a candidate for renomination in 1850.

He was Treasurer of Harvard University from 1842 to 1853.

He published a Sketch of the History of Harvard College and of its Present State (Boston, 1848), and edited selections from the sermons of Dr. Francis W. P. Greenwood, with a memoir (2 vols., Boston, 1844). He contributed writings to the North American Review and the Christian Examiner.

Personal life
On June 13, 1826, he married Mary Lyman the daughter of Theodore Lyman (1753-1839) born in York Maine, and his second wife Lydia Pickering Williams of Salem Massachusetts, the daughter of George Williams and niece of Colonel Timothy Pickering, the third United States Secretary of State under Presidents George Washington and John Adams.

Lyman became prosperous in the East India trade and an influential merchant in Boston, building a country estate known as the "Vale" (Lyman Estate) in Waltham, Massachusetts, where his daughter Mary and Samuel would be married. The marriage produced four daughters and two sons, including Charles William Eliot, a future president of Harvard University.

Between 1829 and 1830 he built a lavish house at 31 Beacon Street, now the western edge of the Massachusetts Statehouse lawn.

He died in Cambridge, Massachusetts on January 29, 1862, and his body was interred in Mount Auburn Cemetery.

See also

 Timeline of Boston, 1830s

Notes

References
 
 Image from Mayors of Boston: An Illustrated Epitome of who the Mayors Have Been and What they Have Done, Boston, MA: State Street Trust Company, Page 12, (1914).

Further reading

External links
 

1798 births
1862 deaths
Massachusetts state senators
Mayors of Boston
Massachusetts city council members
Members of the Massachusetts House of Representatives
Harvard Divinity School alumni
Eliot family (America)
Boston Latin School alumni
Burials at Mount Auburn Cemetery
Whig Party members of the United States House of Representatives from Massachusetts
19th-century American politicians